The 1937 Bewdley by-election was held on 29 June 1937.  The by-election was held due to the elevation to the peerage of the incumbent Conservative MP, Stanley Baldwin.  It was won by the Conservative candidate Roger Conant.

References

1937 elections in the United Kingdom
1937 in England
20th century in Worcestershire
By-elections to the Parliament of the United Kingdom in Worcestershire constituencies
Bewdley